Dalibor Gatarić (born 18 May 1986) is a Bosnian-Herzegovinian and German former footballer who played as a midfielder.

Career
Gatarić was born in Modriča. He played three games in the 2. Bundesliga for Rot-Weiß Oberhausen during the 2004–05 season. He later played for several Regionalliga and Oberliga sides.

Personal life
His twin brother Danijel, also a former footballer, played alongside him at Hammer SpVg.

References

External links
 
 

1986 births
Living people
People from Modriča
Sportspeople from Banja Luka
Bosnia and Herzegovina footballers
Association football midfielders
Identical twins
Twin sportspeople
Bosnia and Herzegovina twins
2. Bundesliga players
Regionalliga players
Oberliga (football) players
Rot-Weiß Oberhausen players
1. FC Köln II players
FSV Oggersheim players
Wormatia Worms players
Sportfreunde Lotte players
Wuppertaler SV players
Hammer SpVg players
TV Jahn Hiesfeld players
Bosnia and Herzegovina expatriate footballers
Expatriate footballers in Germany
Bosnia and Herzegovina expatriate sportspeople in Germany